M.I.A is an English recording artist, songwriter, painter and director of Tamil descent. Her compositions combine elements of electronic, dance, alternative, hip hop and world music. She has been nominated for various awards including Academy Award, MOBO Award, MTV Video Music Award, MTV Europe Music Award, Grammy Award and the prestigious Mercury Prize. She is the only artist in history to be nominated for an Academy Award, Grammy Award, Brit Award, Mercury Prize and Alternative Turner Prize, and the first artist of Asian descent to be nominated for an Academy and Grammy Award in the same year. Her award-winning career spans 13 years. This is the list of awards and nominations received by her.

Art

Alternative Prize

Film

Sundance Film Festival

Music

Academy Awards
The Academy Awards, informally known as The Oscars, are a set of awards given annually for excellence of cinematic achievements. The Oscar statuette is officially named the Academy Award of Merit and is one of nine types of Academy Awards. M.I.A. has received one nomination for O...Saya from the motion picture Slumdog Millionaire.

ASCAP

Asian Music Awards
M.I.A. has received 2 nominations in 2012.

Antville Music Video Awards
The Antville Music Video Awards are online awards for the best music video and music video directors of the year. They were first awarded in 2005. M.I.A. has received six awards from seven nominations.

|-
| rowspan="3" | 2010
| rowspan="3" | "Born Free"
| Video of the Year 
| 
|-
| Best Editing 
| 
|-
| rowspan="2" | Best Cinematography
| 
|-
| rowspan="3" | 2012
| rowspan="3" | "Bad Girls"
| 
|-
| Best Performance 
| 
|-
| rowspan="2" | Video of the Year 
| 
|-
| 2015
| "Borders"
|

BBC Radio 3 Award for World Music
The BBC Radio 3 Awards for World Music was an award given to world music artists between 2002 and 2008, sponsored by BBC Radio 3.

BET Awards
The BET Awards were established in 2001 by the Black Entertainment Television network to celebrate African Americans and other minorities in music, acting, sports, and other fields of entertainment over the past year. M.I.A. has received 1 award from 2 nominations.

Billboard Awards

Billboard Mid Year Awards

Billboard Music Awards

!Ref.
|-
| rowspan=2|2007
| M.I.A.
| Top Electronic Artist
| 
|rowspan=2|
|-
| Kala
| Top Electronic Album
| 
|-
| rowspan=4|2008
| rowspan=2|M.I.A.
| Top Hot Dance Singles Sales Artist
| 
|rowspan=4|
|-
| Top Electronic Artist
| 
|-
| Kala
| Top Electronic Album
| 
|-
| "Paper Planes"
| Top Hot Dance Single Sales
|

BT Digital Music Awards
The BT Digital Music Awards (DMA) were created in the UK in 2001 and are held annually. M.I.A. has received one nomination.

Berlin Music Video Awards
The Berlin Music Video Awards (BMVAs) are an annual festival that puts filmmakers and the art behind music videos in the spotlight.

|-
| 2015
| "Double Bubble Trouble"
| Best Concept 
|

Brit Awards
The Brit Awards are the British Phonographic Industry's (BPI) annual pop music awards.

|-
| 2009
| Herself
| British Female Solo Artist
| 
|

Canadian Independent Music Awards
The Canadian Independent Music Awards, also known as the Independent Music Awards or Indies, are presented annually to musical artists and bands to acknowledge their artistic and technical achievements in all aspects of music. M.I.A. has received 1 award from 4 nominations.

D&AD Awards
Design and Art Direction (D&AD) is a British educational charity which exists to promote excellence in design and advertising. 

|-
| rowspan=2|2011
| rowspan=2|"Born Free"
| Music Video
| style="background:#8a8b89"| Graphite Pencil
|-
| Cinematography
| style="background:#8a8b89"| Graphite Pencil

Danish Music Awards
The Danish Music Awards (DMA) is a Danish award show. M.I.A. has received one nomination.

|-
| 2006
| Herself
| Best International Newcomer
|

Grammy Awards
A Grammy Award (originally called Gramophone Award) – or Grammy – is an accolade by the National Academy of Recording Arts and Sciences of the United States to recognize outstanding achievement in the music industry. M.I.A. received 3 nominations.

Groovelot Music and Fashion Awards

Hungarian Music Awards
The Hungarian Music Awards is the national music awards of Hungary, held every year since 1992 and promoted by Mahasz.
{| class="wikitable"
|-
! Year !! Nominated Work !! Award !! Result !! Ref.
|-
| 2021
| "Franchise" (with Travis Scott & Young Thug)
| Best Foreign Rap or Hip-Hop Recording 
| 
|

Ibiza Music Video Festiva
Ibiza Music Video Festival is the online music video competition. Rupert Bryan and Elizabeth Fear founded the event in 2013.

|-
| 2017
| "P.O.W.A."
| Best Choreography 
|

International Dance Music Awards
The International Dance Music Award was established in 1985. It is a part of the Winter Music Conference, a weeklong electronic music event held annually. 

|- 
| 2008
| "Boyz"
| Best Dance Music Video 
| 
|-
| 2009
| "Paper Planes"
| Best Rap/Hip-Hop Dance Track
|

Ivor Novello Awards

The Ivor Novello Awards are awarded for songwriting and composing. The awards, named after the Cardiff born entertainer Ivor Novello, are presented annually in London by the British Academy of Songwriters, Composers and Authors (BASCA).

|-
| 2009
| "Paper Planes"
| Best Selling UK Single
|

Mercury Prize
The Mercury Prize, formerly called the Mercury Music Prize and currently known as the Barclaycard Mercury Prize for sponsorship reasons, is an annual music prize awarded for the best album from the United Kingdom and Ireland. M.I.A. has received 1 nomination in 2005.

MTV Awards

MTV Europe Music Awards
The MTV Europe Music Awards ("EMAs") were established in 1994 by MTV Networks Europe to celebrate the most popular music videos in Europe.

MTV Video Music Awards
An MTV Video Music Award (commonly abbreviated as a VMA) is an award presented by the cable channel MTV to honor the best in music videos. M.I.A. has received 3 awards from 5 nominations.

MTV O Music Awards
M.I.A. received one nomination in 2012.

mtvU Woodie Awards

MVPA Awards

|-
| 2012
| "Bad Girls"
| Best International Video
|

MOBO Awards
The Music of Black Origin Awards, established in 1996 by Kanya King MBE and Andy Ruffell, are held annually in the United Kingdom to recognise artists of any ethnicity or nationality performing black music.

NME Awards
The NME Awards are an annual music awards show, founded by the music magazine NME.

|-
| rowspan="4" | 2013 || rowspan="3" | "Bad Girls" || Best Track || 
|-
| Best Music Video || 
|-
|  Best Dancefloor Anthem || 
|-
| @MIAuniverse || Best Twitter || 
|-
| rowspan="1" | 2017 || M.I.A || Best British Female ||

Q Awards
The Q Awards are the UK's annual music awards run by the music magazine Q.

Rober Awards Music Prize

|-
| 2007
| "Jimmy"
| Best Cover Version
| 
|-
| rowspan=2|2008
| "Paper Planes"
| Song of the Year 
| 
|-
| Herself
| Best Hip-Hop
| 
|-
| 2010
| "Born Free"
| rowspan=3|Best Promo Video
| 
|-
| 2012
| "Bad Girls"
| 
|-
| 2015
| "Borders"
|

Shortlist Music Prize
The Shortlist Music Prize, stylized as (shôrt–lĭst), was an annual music award for the best album released in the United States that had sold fewer than 500,000 copies at the time of nomination.

South Bank Show Awards

UK Asian Music Awards
The UK Asian Music Awards, also known by the abbreviation UK AMA, is an awards show that is held annually in the United Kingdom since 2002. M.I.A. has received 3 nominations.

UK Music Video Awards

The UK Music Video Awards is an annual award ceremony founded in 2008 to recognise creativity, technical excellence and innovation in music videos and moving images for music. M.I.A. has received three awards from nine nominations.

|-
| 2010
| "Born Free"
| Best Dance Video 
|  
|-
| rowspan="6" | 2012
| rowspan="6" | "Bad Girls"
| Video of the Year
|  
|-
| Best Pop Video
| 
|-
| Best Styling 
|  
|-
| Best Art Direction 
|  
|-
| Best Cinematography
|  
|-
| Best Editing 
|  
|-
| 2014
| "Double Bubble Trouble"
| Best Urban Video - UK 
| 
|-
| 2021
| "Franchise" (with Travis Scott and Young Thug)
| Best Hip Hop/Grime/Rap Video - International
|

XM Nation Music Awards
Awarded annually by XM Satellite Radio since 2005, the XM Nation Music Awards "honor some of the most talented and interesting musicians today." 

|-
|2005
| Herself
| Most Important Indie Emerging Artist 
|

References

MIA